Civrieux-d'Azergues (literally Civrieux of Azergues) is a commune in the Rhône department in eastern France.

See also
Communes of the Rhône department

References

Communes of Rhône (department)